An election to Cumbria County Council took place on 2 May 2013 as part of the 2013 United Kingdom local elections. All 84 councillors were elected from electoral divisions which returned one county councillor each by first-past-the-post voting for a four-year term of office. Following an electoral review carried out by the Local Government Boundary Commission for England, newly drawn electoral divisions were used without change in the number of county councillors.

All locally registered electors (British, Irish, Commonwealth and European Union citizens) who were aged 18 or over on Thursday 2 May 2013 were entitled to vote in the local elections. Those who were temporarily away from their ordinary address (for example, away working, on holiday, in student accommodation or in hospital) were also entitled to vote in the local elections, although those who had moved abroad and registered as overseas electors cannot vote in the local elections. It is possible to register to vote at more than one address (such as a university student who had a term-time address and lives at home during holidays) at the discretion of the local Electoral Register Office, but it remains an offence to vote more than once in the same local government election. Prior to the election the Conservatives were in a joint administration with Labour, the Liberal Democrats being in opposition.

Summary
The election saw the council remain in no overall control. However Labour councillors overtook Conservatives to become the largest party on the county council.

The Liberal Democrat and Conservative parties had enough seats to form a coalition, with the support of some of the Independents, but following the election of a new Leader of the Liberal Democrat Group, a coalition was formed between them and Labour, with the Conservatives going into opposition .

Results

Members elected
The election returned members as follows:

References

2013 English local elections
2013
2010s in Cumbria